According to the United States' State Department, Japan is a major destination, source, and transit country for men and women subjected to forced labor and sex trafficking. Victims of human trafficking include male and female migrant workers, women and children lured to Japan by fraudulent marriages and forced into prostitution, as well as Japanese nationals, "particularly runaway teenage girls and foreign-born children of Japanese citizens who acquired nationality." According to the 2014 U.S. State Department's Trafficking in Persons Report, "The Government of Japan does not fully comply with the minimum standards for the elimination of trafficking; however, it is making significant efforts to do so."

U.S. State Department's Office to Monitor and Combat Trafficking in Persons placed the country in "Tier 2"  in 2017. Japan  ratified the 2000 UN TIP Protocol on July 11, 2017.

In 2005 Irene Khan, then the Secretary General of Amnesty International, stated that the country received the largest number of trafficked persons globally, with the most common points of origin of victims being Southeast Asia, Eastern Europe, and South America.

History

Karayuki-san was the name given to Japanese girls and women in the late 19th and early 20th centuries who were trafficked from poverty stricken agricultural prefectures in Japan to destinations in East Asia, Southeast Asia, Siberia (Russian Far East), Manchuria, and British India to serve as prostitutes and sexually serviced men from a variety of races, including Chinese, Europeans, native Southeast Asians, and others.

Sex trafficking 

Japanese and foreign women and girls have been victims of sex trafficking in Japan. They are raped in brothels and other locations and experience physical and psychological trauma.

See also
Human rights in Japan#Trafficking of persons
Crime in Japan
Polaris Project
Jake Adelstein

References

 
Human rights abuses in Japan